Eulaliopsis binata, the sabaigrass or Chinese alpine rush, is a perennial plant belonging to the grass family that is grown in many Asian countries like China, Nepal, India, Pakistan, Bhutan, Myanmar, Thailand, Malaysia and Philippines.

It is called bhabhar in India and lends the name to the region south of Himalayas where it grows. It is called Babiyo in Nepal.

It is mainly used for the manufacture of writing and printing paper. Pulping is done using soda and sulfate processes.In Nepal, it is used to make rope for swing for Dashain festival, one of the greatest festivals of Hindu people.

References

Flora of Asia
Plants described in 1789
Andropogoneae